Alicia Austin (born 1942) is an American fantasy and science fiction artist and illustrator. She works in print-making, Prismacolor, pastels and watercolors.

Early life and education 
Austin was born in Providence, Kentucky. As her father was career military, she grew up in Germany and Japan, as well as the United States. She studied art and biology on an art scholarship at the Sacred Heart Dominican College in Houston, Texas, which closed in 1975. Her early influences include Edmund Dulac, Arthur Rackham, and N.C. Wyeth.

Career 
In the beginning of her career, she illustrated for fanzines, such as Energumen, Granfalloon, Aspidistra, and Science Fiction Review. She sold every piece of work entered in the 1969 Sci-Fi Worldcon in St. Louis, and then began accepting professional assignments. Her first two assignments were the first two Universe anthologies, which were edited by Terry Carr. She then became a regular artist for Zertex Magazine. Austin has illustrated books by Robert E. Howard, C. L. Moore, Andre Norton, Harold Lamb, Poul Anderson, Lewis Shiner, and Ursula K. Le Guin.  A collection of her work, Alicia Austin's Age of Dreams, was published by Donald M. Grant, Publisher, Inc. in 1978.

Personal life 
She was partners with Jinx Beers, a lesbian activist, until her death in 2018. She lives in Los Angeles, California.

Awards 
 Hugo Award for Best Fan Artist (1971)
 World Fantasy Award - Artist (1979)
 Balrog Award - Best Professional Publication (1979)
 Inkpot Award (1991)
 Chesley Awards nomination (1989) (1993)

Bibliography
 New Worlds of Fantasy#3 (1971)
 Universe 1 (1971)
 The Mask of Circe (1971)
 Universe 2 (1972)
 Echoes from an Iron Harp (1972)
 A Witch Shall be Born (1975)
 Black God's Shadow (1977)
 Alicia Austin's Age of Dreams (1978)
 The Demon of Scattery (1979)
 Destinies (1979)
 Destinies (1979)
 The Last Castle (1980)
 Voorloper (1980)
 The Illustrated Night Before Christmas (1980)
 Destinies (1980)
 Destinies (1980)
 Dragons of Light (1980)
 The Magic May Return (1981)
 Scarlet Dream (1981)
 The Forgotten Beasts of Eld (1981)
 Nirwana (1981)
 Durandal (1981)
 A Christmas Carol (1981)
 Asimov's Science Fiction (1981)
 Asimov's Science Fiction (1981)
 On St. Hubert's Thing (1982)
 The Adventure of Cobbler's Rune (1982)
 Amazing Stories (1982)
 The Sea of the Ravens (1983)
 Night's Master (1985)
 Marion Zimmer Bradley's Fantasy Magazine (1988-2000)
 Bridging the Galaxies (1993)
 Cat's Paw (2007)

References

External links

1942 births
Living people
Fantasy artists
Hugo Award-winning artists
Inkpot Award winners
Science fiction artists
American speculative fiction artists
People from Providence, Kentucky
World Fantasy Award-winning artists
American printmakers
American watercolorists
American women illustrators
American illustrators
American women printmakers
Women watercolorists
Kentucky women artists
21st-century American women artists